Kenyan–Norwegian relations are bilateral relations between Kenya and Norway.

History
Presently, relations between both countries are cordial.

Diplomatic relations between both countries were established shortly after Kenya's independence from the United Kingdom in 1963.

In 1990, diplomatic relations between Kenya and Norway were severed due to Norway's criticism of the Kenyan government and its leadership. Ties were restored in 1994 by the Norwegian ambassador appointed in 1997.

Norway's Trade Minister, Monica Mæland, led a delegation of 54 companies to Kenya in September 2015.

Foreign Minister Børge Brende visited Nairobi for the 10th Ministerial Conference of the World Trade Organization held at the Kenyatta International Convention Centre in December 2015.

Development cooperation
Norway is cooperating with Kenya with a shift from aid to trade and investment.

Key areas for Kenya and Norwegian cooperation are:
Human rights
Governance

Economic relations
Total trade is approximately KES. 8.1 billion (EUR. 72.4 million).

In 2014 Kenya exported goods worth KES. 5.8 billion (EUR. 51.8 million) to Norway. In addition, Norway exported goods worth KES. 2.3 billion (EUR. 20.5 million).

Kenya's main exports to Norway include: plants, flowers, coffee, tea and spices.

60% of Norway's exports to Kenya are made up of chemical fertiliser.

The Norwegian Sovereign Wealth Fund invested in Kenya in 2012, as of 2015 total investment is worth KES. 8.2 billion (EUR. 73.25 million). Norfund, which is an investment fund for small and medium-sized companies in emerging countries, established its Nairobi office in 2007. The Norwegian office for trade, Innovation Norway, also opened its Nairobi office in 2014.

Diplomatic missions
Kenya's embassy in Stockholm is accredited to Norway. Norway has an embassy in Nairobi.

External links
Embassy of Kenya | Stockholm
Norway | the official site in Kenya

References

 
Norway
Bilateral relations of Norway